Kim Damgaard Christensen (born 16 July 1979) is a Danish retired professional footballer who played as a goalkeeper. He got his breakthrough with Danish club FC Nordsjælland in 2004, before moving to Swedish club IFK Göteborg, with whom he won the 2008 Swedish Cup. He joined F.C. Copenhagen in June 2010. He played one game for the Denmark national team.

Club career
Born in Hvidovre, Christensen started playing football with amateur team Rosenhøj, and represented the team for 101 games. He joined Danish 1st Division team Hvidovre IF in 2002, and played one season with the club as it was relegated during the 2002–03 season. He moved to newly promoted 1st Division team Nykøbing Falster Alliancen, and helped the team finish eighth in the 2003–04 season.

FC Nordsjælland
Christensen joined Danish Superliga club FC Nordsjælland in 2004, competing with Japanese international Yoshi Kawaguchi for the starting position. While Kawaguchi was away to play for the Japanese national team during the pre-season, Christensen established himself as the starting goalkeeper. He played all 33 league games as Nordsjælland finished in 10th place in the 2004–05 season, and also saw off the competition from backup keeper Jan Budtz.

He also played all games of the following 2004–05 season, as the team finished ninth. When Tommy Olsen rescinded his place as team captain in May 2006, Christensen was chosen the next captain of Nordsjælland. In an April 2007 game against F.C. Copenhagen, Christensen made an uncharacteristic mistake as Nordsjælland lost 1–0, when he mistimed a kick of the ball, leaving it rolling into the empty net. He still played all Nordsjælland games of the 2006–07 season, helping the club finish fifth. In November 2007, Christensen expressed the wish to move abroad, in order to be in contention for a place in the Danish national team. He looked to leave the club during the winter transfer window, after a total 117 league games in a row for FC Nordsjælland.

IFK Göteborg
Christensen transferred to IFK Göteborg on 13 March 2008, as a replacement for club legend Bengt Andersson, who had retired after the previous season. He made his debut on 22 March in the Swedish Super Cup final against Kalmar FF. IFK Göteborg won 3–1 to secure the 2008 Swedish Super Cup trophy. Christensen kept the number 1 spot for the entire 2008 season, playing every single minute in the league and was widely praised for his performances. Towards the end of the season, Christensen kept his opponents from scoring in six straight games, among others in the away game against the eventual champions Kalmar FF.

On 21 September 2008, Christensen won his second title with the club when Kalmar FF were defeated in the 2008 Swedish Cup final on penalty shootout, after drawing the game 0–0. Christensen himself was hailed as a hero, making several impressive saves during the game and also scoring in the penalty shootout.

In a match on 23 September 2009 against Örebro it was discovered that, prior to the match start, Christensen lifted and moved both goal posts inwards, thus making his goal smaller. 20 minutes into the game, the referee was notified of the infraction and corrected the positions of the goal posts. When interviewed after the game, Christensen said he had done so before on many occasions and perhaps that was the reason he was able to keep goals out.

F.C. Copenhagen
In June 2010, he moved back to Denmark, as he signed a three-and-a-half-year contract with defending Superliga champions F.C. Copenhagen.

In Copenhagen his role initial became as reserve for the first choice Johan Wiland, with Christensen only getting playtime against minor teams and at injuries. His first start for the Danish champions came on 1 May 2011, where he held a clean sheet against SønderjyskE in a 3–0 win.

During the autumn 2012, Johan Wiland was kept out in two longer periods with injuries, whereas Christensen played 16 full matches, including four games in the UEFA Europa League group stage.

From the beginning of the 2013–14 season, Christensen was overtaken by Jakob Busk as reserve keeper, which has left Christensen disappointed and prepared to leave Copenhagen at the end of his contract at New Year.

International career
Christensen made his first international appearance, when he joined the Denmark League XI national football team for unofficial games at the 2009 King's Cup in January 2009. He made his debut in the final of the tournament, as the League XI team beat Thailand on penalty shoot-out on 23 January. He was also a part of the squad during the 2010 King's Cup of January 2010, playing two games as the League XI retained their title.

After joining IFK, Christensen was called up for the Danish national team in September 2008, to replace the injured Thomas Sørensen and Jesper Christiansen, but did not play. He was once more a part of the squad in August 2009, replacing Jesper Christiansen, but established himself as third choice keeper in September 2009. He was included in the Danish preliminary squad for the 2010 World Cup in South Africa. He made his national team debut on 27 May 2010, but was cut from the final 23-man squad in favour of Jesper Christiansen.

Honours
IFK Göteborg
Swedish Super Cup: 2008
Swedish Cup: 2008

Copenhagen
Danish Superliga: 2010–11, 2012–13, 2015–16, 2016–17
Danish Cup: 2011–12, 2014–15, 2015–16, 2016–17

References

External links
 F.C. Copenhagen profile
 
 Danish Superliga statistics
 IFK Göteborg profile
  (2008–2010 Allsvenskan statistics)

1979 births
Living people
People from Fredericia
Danish men's footballers
Association football goalkeepers
Denmark international footballers
Hvidovre IF players
Nykøbing FC players
FC Nordsjælland players
IFK Göteborg players
F.C. Copenhagen players
Danish Superliga players
Allsvenskan players
Danish expatriate men's footballers
Danish expatriate sportspeople in Sweden
Expatriate footballers in Sweden
Sportspeople from the Region of Southern Denmark